Australian cyclists have ridden in the Tour de France since 1914. In the 1980s, Phil Anderson became the first Australian cyclist to win a stage and wear the yellow jersey. Cadel Evans has been the only Australian cyclist to win the yellow jersey by winning the 2011 Tour de France.

History

Australian cyclists have competed in the Tour de France since 1914 with Don Kirkham and Iddo Munro being the first representatives. Australian participation was sporadic until the 1980s. Two notable Australian riders before the 1980s were Hubert Opperman and Russell Mockridge, a gold medallist from the 1952 Olympic Games.

In the 1980s, Phil Anderson, Allan Peiper and Neil Stephens heralded Australian cyclists increased focus on the Tour. In 1991, the Australian Institute of Sport (AIS) established a road cycling program under Head Coach Heiko Salzwedel. This program lead to the development of many future Australian touring cyclists including Robbie McEwen, Patrick Jonker, Michael Rogers and Henk Vogels. In conjunction with the AIS road cycling team, the AIS track cycling program under the guidance of Charlie Walsh was developing endurance track riders including Stuart O'Grady, Bradley McGee and Brett Lancaster. Cadel Evans who won the Tour in 2011 was an AIS mountain bike scholarship holder in the lead up to the 2000 Sydney Olympics. By 2010, there were 11 Australian cyclists on the Tour. In 2011, Orica–GreenEDGE was launched with financial support from Australian Gerry Ryan and made their debut at the 2013 Tour de France. Cadel Evans became Australia's first and only winner of the Tour in 2011.

In November 2014, Cycling Australia announced its Tour de France Team of the Century to recognize Australia's first participation in the Tour. The team comprised nine riders: Cadel Evans and Phil Anderson (general classification), Richie Porte and Michael Rogers (domestiques), Robbie McEwen (sprinter), Bradley McGee and Mark Renshaw (sprint lead out riders), Simon Gerrans (all rounder) and Hubert Opperman (team captain).

Special Broadcasting Service has broadcast the Tour to Australian television viewers since 1991.

Statistics

Overall statistics at end of 2021 Tour de France
 67 Australian cyclists have ridden in the Tour from 1914 to 2022.
 Australia had 12 cyclists at the 2012 Tour de France and followed by 11 cyclists at the 2013 Tour de France and 2018 Tour de France.
 Stuart O'Grady has ridden 17 Tours, followed by Phil Anderson with 13 tours
 Cadel Evans is the only Australian cyclist to win the Tour de France2011
 Cadel Evans & Richie Porte are only riders to finish tour on podium. Cadel did this 3 times (1st 2011 & 2nd 2007–08). Porte was 3rd in 2020.
 Phil Anderson was the first Australian stage winner and yellow jersey holder.  
 seven Australian cyclists have worn the yellow jerseyPhil Anderson, Bradley McGee, Stuart O'Grady, Robbie McEwen, Cadel Evans, Simon Gerrans and Rohan Dennis 
 three Australian cyclists have won the green jerseyRobbie McEwen, Baden Cooke and Michael Matthews 
 six Australian cyclists have held the green jerseyStuart O'Grady, Robbie McEwen, Bradley McGee, Baden Cooke, Rohan Dennis and Michael Matthews
 no Australian cyclist has won the polka dot jersey
 only one Australian cyclist has held the polka dot jerseyCadel Evans
 only one Australian cyclist has won the white jerseyPhil Anderson
 two Australian cyclists have held the white jerseyPhil Anderson and Rohan Dennis
 there have been 37 individual stage wins by 14 Australian cyclists (includes dual nationals)Robbie McEwen12, Caleb Ewan5, Michael Matthews3,  Stuart O'Grady2, Bradley McGee2, Phil Anderson2, Simon Gerrans2, Cadel Evans2, Michael Rogers1, Neil Stephens1, Rohan Dennis1, Baden Cooke1, Heinrich Haussler1   Ben O’Connor – 1, Simon Clarke – 1 
 there have been 9 Australian cyclists that have been members of stage team time trial winsStuart O'Grady2,  Simon Gerrans2,  Simon Clarke1, Rohan Dennis1, Matthew Goss1, Brett Lancaster1, Cameron Meyer1, Allan Peiper1 and Richie Porte1
 five Australian Olympic gold medallists have ridden in the TourRussell Mockridge, Stuart O'Grady, Bradley McGee, Brett Lancaster and Luke Roberts

Leading Australian cyclists

Australian cyclists that have competed in five or more Tours de France as of the 2022 Tour.

List of Australian cyclists

Table includes dual national Australian cyclists.

See also
List of Australian cyclists who have led the Tour de France general classification
:Category:Australian Tour de France stage winners

Notes

References

External links
Tour de France race database
Australian Cycling Memories - Tour de France
Cycling Archives website

Further reading

 O'Grady, Stuart and Homfray, Reece (2014), Battle Scars, Melbourne, Hardie Grant.
Evans, Cadel (2011). Cadel Evans : the long road to Paris, Melbourne, Hardie Grant. 2011.
McEwan, Robbie and Pickering, Edward (2011),One way road, Sydney, Ebury Press.
Guinness, Rupert (2009). What a ride from Phil Anderson to Cadel Evans : an Aussie pursuit of the Tour de France, Sydney, Allen and Unwin.
Curtis, Martin (2008), Russell Mockridge : the man in front, Melbourne, Melbourne Books.
Peiper, Allan with Sidwells, Chris (2005), A Peiper's tale, London, Sport & Publicity. 
Guinness, Rupert (2003), Aussie Aussie Aussie Oui Oui Oui! Australian Cyclists in the 100 years of the Tour de France, Sydney, Random House Australia.
Anderson, Phil with Valentine-Anderson, Christi (1999), Philip Anderson : cycling legend, Melbourne, Lothian.
Opperman, Hubert (1977), Pedals, politics and people, Sydney, Haldane Publishing.
Sir Hubert Opperman interviewed by Mel Pratt in the Mel Pratt collection (1975), National Library of Australia
Burrowes, John (1960), My world on wheels : the posthumous autobiography of Russell Mockridge, London, Stanley Paul.

Tour de France-related lists
 
Tour de France
Lists of cyclists
Cyclists
Tour de France people